Cyprus competed in the Eurovision Song Contest 1999, held on 29 May 1999 at the International Convention Center in Jerusalem, Israel. The Cyprus Broadcasting Corporation (CyBC) organised a public selection process to determine its entry for the contest. Nine songs competed in the national final, held on 9 February 1999, where a panel of high-profile media personalities selected the winning song. Marlain Angelidou with the song "Tha 'nai erotas" received the most votes and was selected to represent the nation in the contest. Angelidou performed 14th at the international contest and at the close of the voting process, finished in 22nd place, receiving just two points from the United Kingdom. The result was seen as unexpected as Cyprus had been a favourite to win the contest in betting odds.

Background

It then participated yearly, only missing the 1988 contest when its selected song "Thimame" by Yiannis Dimitrou was disqualified for being previously released. Cyprus' least successful result was in  when it placed last with the song "Tora zo" by Elpida, receiving only four points in total.

Before Eurovision

National final 
To select its entry for the Eurovision Song Contest 1999, CyBC hosted a national final on 9 February 1999 at the Monte Caputo Nightclub in Limassol. Nine entries competed in event, hosted by Loukas Hamatsos. The candidate entries were selected in January by a panel of jurors, which reviewed 66 songs in a first round reduced to 30, and finally 10. One of the songs "24 Years", was subsequently removed from consideration citing production problems, leaving nine songs to compete. The winning song chosen solely by a panel of high-profile media personalities, one of whom was Thanos Kalliris, who had represented Greece in 1987 as part of Bang.

The winning song was "Tha 'nai erotas", composed by George Kallis, with lyrics by Andreas Karanicolas, and performed by Marlain Angelidou. Angelidou had previously attempted to represent Cyprus in the previous year's contest as part of a duo, placing second behind Michalis Hatzigiannis.

Promotion
To promote the entry, an event was held at Zoo nightclub in Cyprus where Angelidou and her team were greeted by media while the music video of "Tha 'nai erotas" played in the background. The song was commercially released by record label Malvina Music.

At Eurovision
The Eurovision Song Contest 1999 took place at the International Convention Center in Jerusalem, Israel on 29 May 1999. According to Eurovision rules, the 23-country participant list for the contest was composed of: the winning country from the previous year's contest; the 17 countries, other than the previous year's winner, which had obtained the highest average number of points over the last five contests; and any countries which had not participated in the previous year's content. Cyprus was one of the 17 countries with the highest average scores, and thus were permitted to participate. The running order for the contest was decided by a draw held on 17 November 1998; Cyprus was assigned position 14, following  and preceding . 

Prior to the contest, the nation had reached first place in betting odds in April, which prompted a Cypriot delegation representative to respond at a CyBC press conference, saying they would prefer to not win due to the costs of hosting the next year and would instead prefer to place a "respectable second". By late May, however, the British company Ladbrokes had shown Cyprus falling to a predicted sixth place. Despite the odds, the entry only received two points, both from United Kingdom, placing 22nd in the field of 23, beating only Spain. Andrew Adamides of Cyprus Mail wrote in a summary of the contest that Cyprus' poor placing is thought to be attributed to this being the first contest where an entry could be performed in any language (Cyprus' entry was performed in Greek, while the winning song, in English) and possibly due to political voting. For her performance, Angelidou was joined by two backing vocalists: Nicole Jones and Lina Kawar.

Voting
The same voting system in use since 1975 was again implemented for this event, with each country providing 1–8, 10 and 12 points to the ten highest-ranking songs as determined by a selected jury or the viewing public through televoting, with countries not allowed to vote for themselves. This was the second contest to feature widespread public voting, and Cyprus opted to implement this method to determine which countries would receive their points, with an 8-member back-up jury assembled in case technical failures rendered the telephone votes invalid. Around 15,000 calls were registered in Cyprus in total during the five-minute voting window, which determined the nation's points.

References

Further reading

External links
Cypriot National Final 1999

1999
Countries in the Eurovision Song Contest 1999
Eurovision